"Choice of Colors" is a 1969 pop/soul song, written by Curtis Mayfield for The Impressions.  The song hit #1 on Billboard's R&B chart for one week, and went to #21 on the Billboard Hot 100.

Chart positions

References

1969 singles
The Impressions songs
1969 songs
Song recordings produced by Curtis Mayfield
Songs written by Curtis Mayfield